Elvis Loveless is a Canadian politician, who was elected as a Liberal to the Newfoundland and Labrador House of Assembly in the 2019 provincial election. He represents the electoral district of Fortune Bay-Cape La Hune in Central Newfoundland.

On August 19, 2020, Loveless was appointed Minister of Fisheries, Forestry, and Agriculture in the Furey government.

Loveless was re-elected in the 2021 provincial election. He was appointed Minister of Transportation and Infrastructure.

Before being elected, Loveless worked for then-MHA Oliver Langdon. He had previously contested the district in the 2007 provincial election losing to PC candidate Tracey Perry.

Electoral Record

|-

|-

|-
 
|NDP
|Sheldon Hynes
|align="right"|84
|align="right"|2.09%
|align="right"|
|}

References

Living people
Liberal Party of Newfoundland and Labrador MHAs
21st-century Canadian politicians
Year of birth missing (living people)
Members of the Executive Council of Newfoundland and Labrador